Sing Me a Song may refer to:
 Sing Me a Song (song), the Dutch entry in the Eurovision Song Contest 1983
 Sing Me a Song (The Walking Dead), an episode of the television series The Walking Dead
 Sing Me a Song (album), an album by Miriam Makeba